Luis Carranza District is one of eight districts of the province La Mar in Peru.

Annexes of Luis Carranza District

Ancamarca
Ahua
Huachinga
Amaccoto
Asnaccpampa
Ccopayoc
Ccayhuayoc
Parobamba
Tucubamba
Mechecc
Chaupiloma
Chaquipuqio
Sayripata
Chinchipata
Petecc
Mollepucro
Paccaypampa
Moyocc
Pampas
Huaiccohuasi

Ethnic groups 
The people in the district are mainly indigenous citizens of Quechua descent. Quechua is the language which the majority of the population (96.02%) learnt to speak in childhood, 3.72% of the residents started speaking using the Spanish language (2007 Peru Census).

References